The following is a list of programs that were broadcast by BiteTV.

Final programming
Around the Next Bend
Battle Cats
Billy on the Street
Bob and Margaret
Brickleberry
Caution: May Contain Nuts
Comedy Bar (TV series)
Cops
Destination Fear
Free-Loading
Halifax Comedy Festival
Hollywood Hillbillies
The IT Crowd
It’s Always Sunny in Philadelphia
Keith Barry: Brain Hacker
Kids in the Hall: Death Comes to Town
Little Mosque on the Prairie
TheLonleyFrankie
Maury
Park Bench
Party Down South
Penn & Teller: Fool Us
Race to the Scene
The Ron James Show
Ryan Long Is Challenged
S.O.S.: Save Our Skins
Trailer Park Boys
Warren United
Whose Line Is It Anyway?
Winnipeg Comedy Festival
The Yukin’ Funny Comedy Show

Earlier programming
Arrested Development
Comics Without Borders
The Cutting Room
Duck Quacks Don't Echo
E-Town
Extras
Felt Up
Guidance
Mission Hill
Happy Tree Friends
Just for Laughs
The Inbetweeners
Jimmy Kimmel Live!
Kenny vs. Spenny
Made in Canada
MADtv
The Mighty Boosh
Moone Boy
Mr. Show
Mumbai Calling
Ooops!
Papillon
The Peter Serafinowicz Show
Portlandia
Pure Toonacy
Race to the Scene
Stand Up & Bite Me
Stand-Up Sit-Down
Stand Up With Bite
Walk on the Wild Side
The Wrong Coast
The Wrong Mans
This Hour Has 22 Minutes

References

BiteTV